Associazione Calcio Bellaria Igea Marina is an Italian association football club, based in Bellaria – Igea Marina, Emilia-Romagna. Bellaria plays in Serie D.

History 
The club was founded in 1912 and refounded in 1994.

Colors and badge 
The team's colors are light blue and white.

External links
Official website

 
Football clubs in Italy
Football clubs in Emilia-Romagna
Association football clubs established in 1912
Serie C clubs
Province of Rimini
1912 establishments in Italy